The Township of Durham is one of thirty-seven townships in Washington County, Arkansas, USA. As of the 2000 census, its total population was 839.

Durham Township was established in 1884.

Geography
Durham Township was created in 1884.

Cities, towns, villages
Durham

Cemeteries
The township contains Shumate Cemetery.

Major routes
 Arkansas Highway 16

References

 United States Census Bureau 2008 TIGER/Line Shapefiles
 United States National Atlas

External links
 US-Counties.com
 City-Data.com

Townships in Washington County, Arkansas
Populated places established in 1884
Townships in Arkansas
1884 establishments in Arkansas